Gol Bedaq (also Romanized as Gol Bedāq and Gol Bodāq; also known as Gol Bodāgh, Kolbeh Dāgh, and Kulbadāgh) is a village in Hendudur Rural District, Sarband District, Shazand County, Markazi Province, Iran. At the 2006 census, its population was 47, in 17 families.

References 

Populated places in Shazand County